There were three head coaches of the Atlanta Flames in the team's history before the team moved to Calgary before the 1980–81 NHL season.

See also
List of NHL head coaches
Head Coaches of the Calgary Flames
List of current NHL captains
List of NHL players

References
2006–07 Calgary Flames Media Guide

 
Atlanta Flames head coaches
Head coaches